PIA Planetarium is a Pakistani planetarium located in Karachi. Planetarium contains a Sky-Dome and a Boeing 720 AP-AXL standing in a park. It provides the education to students of science. It was established in 1985 firstly in Karachi and then in Lahore. This planetarium is working under Pakistan International Airlines.

References 

Planetaria in Pakistan
Pakistan International Airlines
Buildings and structures in Karachi